Stu Galbraith (born 22 April 1967) is a New Zealand former professional rugby league footballer who played for Chorley Borough, Rochdale Hornets, and Parramatta Eels

Playing career
Galbraith started his career off with The Northcote Tigers before moving to England and played for English teams Chorley Borough and Rochdale. In 1992, Galbraith signed for Parramatta and was given the unenviable task of filling the missing halfback spot left by retired Parramatta legend Peter Sterling.  Galbraith played two seasons with Parramatta, but could never match the heights set by his predecessor and left the club at the end of 1994 and then retired from rugby league.

References 

1967 births
Living people
Blackpool Borough players
New Zealand rugby league players
Parramatta Eels players
Rochdale Hornets players
Rugby league halfbacks